Michael Wildner (born 24 April 1970) is a retired Austrian middle-distance runner who competed primarily in the 800 metres. He represented his country at two outdoor and two indoor World Championships. His best placing was the fourth place at the 1996 European Indoor Championships.

His personal bests in the event are 1:46.21 outdoors (Ingolstadt 1992) and 1:47.03 indoors (Karlsruhe 1994). The former is the standing national record.

Competition record

References

1970 births
Living people
Austrian male middle-distance runners
World Athletics Championships athletes for Austria